Emil Rilke (born 19 November 1983) is a Czech former footballer who played as a midfielder. He played for Czech clubs including Teplice, Jablonec 97, SIAD Most, Slovan Liberec, and Ústí nad Labem. Abroad he played for Universitatea Cluj of Romania, German side Hansa Rostock, and Žilina of Slovakia. Rilke was a member of the Czech Republic Under-20 national team which competed in the 2003 U20 FIFA World Cup in the United Arab Emirates.

He won the Corgoň liga in the 2009–2010 season with Žilina. On 21 November 2012 he signed for German side Hansa Rostock in the 3. Liga.

External links
 Rilke's profile on FIFA.com
 
 
 Rilke's profile on MŠK Žilina's Slovak language website

1983 births
Living people
Czech footballers
Czech Republic youth international footballers
Czech Republic under-21 international footballers
Czech expatriate footballers
FK Teplice players
FK Jablonec players
FK Baník Most players
SFC Opava players
MŠK Žilina players
FC Slovan Liberec players
FC Hansa Rostock players
FC Universitatea Cluj players
FK Ústí nad Labem players
Czech First League players
Slovak Super Liga players
Liga I players
Expatriate footballers in Slovakia
Czech expatriate sportspeople in Slovakia
Expatriate footballers in Romania
Czech expatriate sportspeople in Romania
Sportspeople from Ústí nad Labem
3. Liga players
Association football midfielders